Sir Henry Parker (by 1514 – 6 January 1552), of Morley Hall, Hingham, Norfolk and Furneux Pelham, Hertfordshire, was an English politician.

He was the son of Henry Parker, 10th Baron Morley. He shared a common ancestress in Margaret Beauchamp of Bletsoe with Henry VIII.  Parker was the brother of Jane Boleyn née Parker, and thus the brother-in-law of George Boleyn, during the reign of Queen Anne Boleyn. He was knighted KB on 31 May 1533.

He was appointed High Sheriff of Essex and Hertfordshire for 1536–37 and was a Justice of the Peace for Hertfordshire from 1537 to his death. He was also Custos Rotulorum of Hertfordshire from c. 1547 to his death. He was elected a Member (MP) of the Parliament of England for Hertfordshire in 1539 and 1547.

He married twice: firstly Grace, the daughter and heiress of John Newport of Furneux Pelham, having at least 2 sons and a daughter, including Henry Parker, 11th Baron Morley. Secondly he married Elizabeth, the daughter and heiress of Sir Philip Calthorpe of Erwarton, Suffolk, having at least 1 son who predeceased him.

References

1552 deaths
Members of the Parliament of England for Hertfordshire
High Sheriffs of Essex
High Sheriffs of Hertfordshire
English MPs 1539–1540
English MPs 1547–1552
Year of birth uncertain
People from Hingham, Norfolk
People from Furneux Pelham
People from South Norfolk (district)